The  New York Giants season was the franchise's 34th season in the National Football League. Jim Lee Howell was in his fifth year as head coach of the Giants, but more notable were his top two assistants: future Hall of Fame head coaches Vince Lombardi (offensive coordinator) and Tom Landry (defensive coordinator). Lombardi left after the season to lead the Green Bay Packers, while Landry stayed for the 1959 season, then departed for the expansion Dallas Cowboys.

Transactions
The Giants obtained Lindon Crow and Pat Summerall from the Chicago Cardinals in exchange for Dick Nolan, Bobby Joe Conrad, and the Giants' first round pick.
The Giants acquired Carl Karilivacz from the Detroit Lions
Al Barry was an Offensive Guard obtained from the Green Bay Packers
Walt Yowarsky was sent to the San Francisco 49ers

Offseason
In the offseason, Vince Lombardi was offered the Eagles head coaching position but he refused it. He opted to stay as the offensive coordinator of the Giants.

Regular season

Schedule

Game summaries

Week 1: at Chicago Cardinals

Week 2: at Philadelphia Eagles

Week 3: at Washington Redskins

Week 4: vs. Chicago Cardinals

Week 5: vs. Pittsburgh Steelers

Week 6: at Cleveland Browns

Week 7: vs. Baltimore Colts

Week 8: at Pittsburgh Steelers

Week 9: vs. Washington Redskins

Week 10: vs. Philadelphia Eagles

Week 11: at Detroit Lions

Week 12: vs. Cleveland Browns

Playoffs

Eastern Conference Playoff

NFL Championship Game

The 1958 National Football League Championship Game was played on December 28, 1958, at Yankee Stadium in New York City. The 1958 game was the 26th annual NFL championship game. The Colts beat the Giants 23–17 in overtime, earning their first ever championship. The game has come to be known as The Greatest Game Ever Played.

Standings

See also
List of New York Giants seasons

References

External links
 New York Giants on Pro Football Reference
 Giants on jt-sw.com

New York Giants seasons
New York Giants
1958 in sports in New York City
1950s in the Bronx